Bae Beom-geun (born 4 March 1993) is a South Korean professional footballer who plays as a midfielder for who plays for Khujand.

Career

Club
On 27 February 2023, Tajikistan Higher League club Khujand announced the signing of Bae.

References

External links
 

1993 births
Living people
Association football midfielders
South Korean footballers
South Korean expatriate footballers
Sportfreunde Eisbachtal players
KF Shkupi players
ATM FA players
Petaling Jaya City FC players
ŠKF Sereď players
Negeri Sembilan FC players
Malaysia Premier League players
Malaysia Super League players
Slovak Super Liga players
Expatriate footballers in Germany
South Korean expatriate sportspeople in Germany
Expatriate footballers in Malaysia
South Korean expatriate sportspeople in North Macedonia
Expatriate footballers in North Macedonia
South Korean expatriate sportspeople in Malaysia
Expatriate footballers in Slovakia
South Korean expatriate sportspeople in Slovakia